Elik is a surname. Notable people with the surname include:

 Amy Elik, American politician
 Boris Elik (1929–2013), Canadian ice hockey player
 Todd Elik (born 1966), Canadian ice hockey player

See also
 Elek (surname)